Cos is an American sketch comedy/variety TV series that debuted on the ABC Network in September 1976. It was hosted by comedian Bill Cosby and featured an ensemble cast who would perform sketches each week. The show was unsuccessful in the Nielsen ratings and was cancelled by November 1976 and replaced with The Hardy Boys/Nancy Drew Mysteries.

Cosby appeared on this series concurrently with his starring role in Fat Albert and the Cosby Kids and the film Mother, Jugs & Speed.

Episodes

References

External links
 

Bill Cosby
1970s American variety television series
1970s American sketch comedy television series
1976 American television series debuts
1976 American television series endings
American Broadcasting Company original programming